Remixes is a compilation album of remixes by Cristian Castro released in 2000 by BMG.

Track listing

Charts

References

Cristian Castro remix albums
2000 remix albums
Sony BMG compilation albums
Spanish-language remix albums